The 2012–13 season will be Motherwell's fourteenth consecutive season in the Scottish Premier League, having competed in it since its inauguration in 1998–99. Motherwell will also compete in the Champions League, Europa League, League Cup and the Scottish Cup.

Transfers

In

Out

Loans in

Loans out

Released

Competitions

Pre-season Friendlies

Notes
The Pre-season friendly between Motherwell and Rapid București was called off on 9 July, due to a waterlogged pitch at the Grangemouth Stadium.
The Pre-season friendly between Motherwell and Arbroath was called off on 18 July, due to a waterlogged pitch at the Gayfield Park.

Scottish Premier League

Results summary

Results by round

Results by opponent

Source: 2012–13 Scottish Premier League Results Table

Results

Notes
The match between Motherwell and Dundee United was called off on 6 October 2012 due to a power failure in the area. The match has been re-arranged for 7 November 2012.
The match between Motherwell and Dundee United was called off on 29 January 2013 due to a waterlogged pitch. The match has been re-arranged for 19 February 2013.

League table

Scottish Cup

Scottish League Cup

Champions League

Europa League

Squad statistics

Appearances

|-
|colspan="14"|Players no longer at the club:

|-
|}

Top scorers

Disciplinary record

Awards

Manager of the Month

Player of the Month

Young player of the Month

SPL Manager of the Year
 Stuart McCall

Player of the Year
 Michael Higdon

Notes and references

External links
 Motherwell F.C. Website
 BBC My Club Page
 Motherwell F.C. Newsnow

Motherwell F.C. seasons
Motherwell F.C.
Motherwell
Motherwell F.C.